Constantine "Cus" D'Amato (January 17, 1908 – November 4, 1985) was an Italian-American boxing manager and trainer who handled the careers of Mike Tyson, Floyd Patterson, and José Torres, all of whom went on to be inducted into the International Boxing Hall of Fame. Several successful boxing trainers, including Teddy Atlas and Kevin Rooney, were tutored by D'Amato. He was a proponent of the peek-a-boo style of boxing, in which the fighter holds his gloves close to his cheeks and pulls his arms tight against his torso, which was criticized by some because it was believed that an efficient attack could not be launched from it.

Early life
Constantine D'Amato was born into an Italian-American family in the New York City borough of the Bronx on January 17, 1908, to Damiano (1868–1938) and Elisabetta ( Rosato; 1875–1913). Both his parents were from Toritto, Italy. His father delivered ice and coal in the Bronx using a horse and cart. He had three brothers, Rocco, Gerald, and Anthony. At a young age, D'Amato became very involved and interested in Catholicism, and even considered becoming a priest during his youth.

He had a brief career as an amateur boxer, fighting as a featherweight and lightweight, but was unable to get a professional license because of an eye injury he had suffered in a street fight. Cus stated in an interview that he did not hold any grudges towards his father for the childhood abuse, as he believed the beatings made him a better and a more disciplined man.

Career
At age 22, D'Amato opened the Empire Sporting Club with Jack Barrow at the Gramercy Gym. He lived in the gym for years. According to D'Amato, he spent his time at the gym waiting for a "champion", but his best fighters were routinely poached by "connected" managers. One fighter discovered by D'Amato was Italian-American Rocky Graziano, who signed with other trainers and managers and went on to become middleweight champion of the world. D'Amato also confronted boxing politics and decided, along with his friend Howard Cosell, to thwart the International Boxing Club of New York (IBC). Suspicious to the point of paranoia, he refused to match his fighter in any bout promoted by the IBC. The IBC was eventually found to be in violation of anti-trust laws and was dissolved.

Personal life
Cus D'Amato and Camille Ewald (1905–2001) met in the 1940s and entered into a common-law relationship. Ewald was born in Staromishchyna, Ukraine, to Hnat and Anastasia Pershyn Ewaschuk, and adopted the surname Ewald after her family immigrated to Canada. In the early 1960s her home became their home, and the fighters became family. Ewald supported D'Amato in his dedication to training socially challenged youths, and she allowed her home to function as a halfway house for D'Amato's pupils, often fulfilling the role of a mother figure to them. Most notably, D'Amato and Ewald, in anticipation of Mike Tyson's future athletic success, established legal guardianship over the young man in an effort to protect him both personally and financially from the cutthroat boxing establishment. D'Amato and Ewald never married, although their close friendship lasted for decades, until his death.
Cus oversaw all the training and managing of his fighters, while she was responsible for cooking and household chores.

Notable boxers trained

Floyd Patterson

Under D'Amato's tutelage, Floyd Patterson captured the Olympic middleweight gold medal in the 1952 Helsinki games. D'Amato then guided Patterson through the professional ranks, maneuvering Patterson into fighting for the title vacated by Rocky Marciano. After beating Tommy "Hurricane" Jackson in an elimination fight, Patterson faced Light Heavyweight Champion Archie Moore on November 30, 1956, for the World Heavyweight Championship. He beat Moore by a knockout in five rounds and became the youngest World Heavyweight Champion in history at the time, at the age of 21 years, 10 months, three weeks and five days. He was the first Olympic gold medalist to win a professional Heavyweight title.

Patterson and D'Amato split after Patterson's second consecutive 1st-round KO loss to Sonny Liston, although his influence over the former two-time champion had already begun to diminish.

José Torres

D'Amato also managed José Torres who, in May 1965 at Madison Square Garden, defeated International Boxing Hall Of Fame member Willie Pastrano to become world Light Heavyweight champion. With the victory Torres became the third Puerto Rican world boxing champion in history and the first Latin American to win the world Light Heavyweight title.

Mike Tyson

After Patterson and Torres' careers ended, D'Amato worked in relative obscurity. He eventually moved to Catskill, New York, where he opened a gym, the Catskill Boxing Club. There he met and began to work with the future heavyweight champion, "Iron" Mike Tyson, who was in a nearby reform school. He adopted Tyson after Tyson's mother died. D'Amato trained him over the next few years, encouraging the use of peek-a-boo style boxing, with the hands in front of the face for more protection. D'Amato was briefly assisted by Teddy Atlas, and later Kevin Rooney, a protégé of D'Amato, who emphasized elusive movement.

It is unclear at exactly which age (11 or 12) Tyson first became seriously interested in becoming a professional boxer. "Irish" Bobby Stewart, a former Golden Gloves Champion, was approached by Tyson while working as a counselor at the Tryon School For Boys. Tyson knew of Stewart's former boxing glory and specifically asked to speak with Stewart who immediately took on a gruff attitude of the subject after witnessing Tyson's terrible behavior in his first days at the school. Bobby Stewart introduced Mike Tyson to D'Amato when Tyson was around 12 or 13 years old, after Stewart stated he had taught Tyson all he could about boxing technique and skill. D'Amato died a little over a year before Tyson became the youngest world heavyweight titleholder in history at the age of 20 years four months, thus supplanting Patterson's record. Rooney would later guide Tyson to the heavyweight championship twelve months after D'Amato's death. Footage of D'Amato can be seen in Tyson, a 2008 documentary. Tyson credits D'Amato with building his confidence and guiding him as a father figure.

Death
D'Amato died of pneumonia at Mount Sinai Hospital in Manhattan on November 4, 1985. He was 77.

Legacy

Cus D'Amato Memorial Award
Cus D'Amato Memorial Award was established by the Boxing Writers Association of America. The first was presented to Mike Tyson at the group's 61st annual dinner, May 16, 1986.

Science of Victory Marathon
From October 26, 2017, through November 4, 2017, an international, online "Science of Victory" marathon was dedicated to the memory of Cus D'Amato. Several journalists and boxers from Russia, Ukraine, Italy, Spain, Germany and the U.S. took part in this project, including Silvio Branco, Patrizio Oliva, Dr. Antonio Graceffo, Avi Nardia, and Gordon Marino. The marathon promoted the book Non-compromised Pendulum by Tom Patti and Dr. Oleg Maltsev, which reviewed Cus D'Amato's training style.

Portrayals in film, theater, and fiction
George C. Scott portrayed D'Amato in the 1995 HBO movie Tyson.

KNOCKOUT: The Cus D'Amato Story is a stage and screenplay based on the life of Cus D'Amato, from a concept by boxing trainer Kevin Rooney and written by Dianna Lefas.

The biography Confusing The Enemy tells the story of D'Amato.

Harvey Keitel portrayed him in the 2022 Hulu TV series Mike.

Commemoration
In 1993, the 14th Street Union Square Local Development Corporation named part of 14th Street, where D'Amato's Gramercy Gym was located, Cus D'Amato Way.

References

External links

 

1908 births
1985 deaths
Sportspeople from the Bronx
American boxing trainers
American people of Italian descent
Deaths from pneumonia in New York City
American male boxers
Boxers from New York City
People from Catskill, New York